"Call on Me" is the debut single by Australian singer-songwriter Starley. The song was written by her and Peter Wadams. It was made available for digital download on 29 July 2016 through Tinted Records, and it was re-released through Tinted Records and Epic Records on 13 October 2016.

Background
Starley said, "I wrote this song when I was at a low point in my life.... It became a way of telling myself it was going to be ok, almost like an encouragement. It was as if I had created my own lighthouse, a beacon to help me realize my dreams are not impossible. I can do this. I'll figure it out. I just need to follow my intuition and essentially call on myself."

Track listing

Remixes
The track was remixed by a number of DJs on the Call on Me (Remixes) EP for the song including Odd Mob, EDWYNN x TIKAL x Spirix, Ryan Riback, Hella and Raffa.

The remix by South African-Australian DJ Ryan Riback has found success across Europe, and Oceania with his remix version topping Sverigetopplistan, the official Swedish Singles Chart in December 2016, as well as reaching top 10 in Australia, Denmark, Germany, Ireland, the Netherlands, New Zealand, Norway and the United Kingdom.

Charts

Weekly charts

Ryan Riback remix version

Year-end charts

Certifications

References

2016 songs
2016 debut singles
Starley (singer) songs
Epic Records singles
Sony Music singles
Number-one singles in Sweden
Songs written by P-Money